John Morrissey Jr. (born 8 March 1965) is an English former professional footballer who played as a winger. Active between 1984 and 1999, Morrissey made nearly 500 appearances in the Football League.

Career
Born in Liverpool, Morrissey played in the Football League for Everton, Wolverhampton Wanderers, and Tranmere Rovers.

Personal life
His father Johnny was also a professional footballer.

References

1965 births
Living people
English footballers
Everton F.C. players
Wolverhampton Wanderers F.C. players
Tranmere Rovers F.C. players
English Football League players
Footballers from Liverpool
Association football wingers